The Hirth F-23 is a twin cylinder, horizontally-opposed, two stroke, carburetted or optionally fuel injected aircraft engine designed for use on ultralight aircraft. It is manufactured by Hirth of Germany.

Development
The F-23 is intended to compete with the  Rotax 503 and is differentiated from the Rotax powerplant by offering a horizontally-opposed cylinder layout. The F-23 uses free air cooling and piston-ported induction, with dual Bing 34mm slide or optional diaphragm type carburetors. The cylinder walls are electrochemically coated with Nikasil. Standard starting is recoil start. A belt reduction drive system, fuel injection, tuned exhaust and electric start are optional.

The engine runs on a 50:1 pre-mix of unleaded 93 octane auto fuel and oil. Recommended time between overhauls is 1000 hours.

Applications

Specifications (F-23)

References

External links

Hirth aircraft engines
Air-cooled aircraft piston engines
Two-stroke aircraft piston engines